The National Religious Affairs Administration (NRAA), formerly the State Administration for Religious Affairs (SARA), is an external name of the United Front Work Department of the Chinese Communist Party (CCP). Formerly, it was an executive agency directly under the State Council of the People's Republic of China which oversaw religious affairs in the country. SARA was merged into the UFWD in 2018. The names of the former agency were retained by the UFWD as external names under the system called "one institution with two names".

History 
Originally created in 1951 as the Religious Affairs Bureau, SARA was closely connected with the United Front Work Department and charged with overseeing the operations of China's five officially sanctioned religious organizations:

 Buddhist Association of China
 Chinese Taoist Association
 Islamic Association of China
 Three-Self Patriotic Movement (Protestant)
 Catholic Patriotic Association

The State Administration for Religious Affairs was established to exercise control over religious appointments, the selection of clergy, and the interpretation of religious doctrine. SARA was also meant to ensure that the registered religious organizations support and carry out the policy priorities of the CCP. For instance, SARA has maintained a "living Buddha database" to track prominent Tibetan Buddhists who are loyal to the CCP.

Ye Xiaowen directed the SARA from 1995 to 2009. During his tenure, he issued the State Religious Affairs Bureau Order No. 5, which furthered state control over reincarnations in Tibetan Buddhism, and attempted to suppress underground Catholics loyal to Rome (which he considered "colonial") and not to the government-sanctioned Catholic Patriotic Association. After Ye was promoted to the Secretary of the CCP Committee at the Central Institute of Socialism, the former Deputy Director Wang Zuo'an was promoted to Director. Under the Xi Jinping administration, it was announced in 2018 that NRAA was being merged into the UFWD.

See also 

 Religion in China
 Freedom of religion in China
Antireligious campaigns in China

Related PRC authorities 
 United Front Work Department
 State Ethnic Affairs Commission

Similar government agencies 
 Council for Religious Affairs (USSR)
 Ministry of Rites (imperial China)
 Bureau of Buddhist and Tibetan Affairs (Yuan dynasty)
 Directorate of Religious Affairs (Turkey)

References

External links 
  

Government agencies of China
Religion in China
State Council of the People's Republic of China
Year of establishment missing
Organizations associated with the Chinese Communist Party
Religious affairs ministries
United front (China)
One institution with multiple names